Milton Davis is an American musician, songwriter and producer from Birmingham, Alabama, who is based in the California Bay Area. He recalls being introduced to gospel music by his grandfather at the age of seven and playing and singing in gospel groups from his childhood to his teenage years. Davis' grandfather was responsible for managing groups such as The Flying Clouds and The Mighty Clouds of Joy.

Davis' early influences include a large range of style and artists: Parliament Funkadelic, The Meters, Earth Wind & Fire, Roxy Music, Led Zeppelin, Peter Gabriel and Prince. His later influences include Jeff Buckley, Tool, Portishead, Jay-Z, The Foo Fighters, Jamiroquai, Red Hot Chili Peppers and Jane’s Addiction.

His accomplishments include work with 3LW, John Mellencamp, Michael Hedges, Tamia, Dawn Robinson, David Ryan Harris, Eric Benet, Paula Abdul, Chyna Phillips, Idina Menzel, Citizen King, Jhene, Damon Johnson and Al Jarreau. Davis was also responsible for the musical scoring of The Parent Trap.

Discography

References

External links

American music arrangers
Record producers from Alabama
Songwriters from Alabama
Living people
Year of birth missing (living people)